Palghat Parameswara Bhagavathar (1815-1892) was a Carnatic music composer and musician born in Nurani, Kerala, India.

His musical talents developed to such an extent that Swati Tirunal had great admiration and confidence in him.  Whenever the Maharaja composed songs, the Bhagavathar was made to copy them. He used to practice veena and swarabat along with the Maharaja during his leisure.  He also was trained in violin by Vadivelu in the royal court.  Swati Tirunal made him the Chief Palace Musician towards the end of his regime after the death of Vadivelu.

His compositions are in Sanskrit, resembling those of Swati Tirunal and Dikshitar.  He composed many Varnams and Keertanams. The Varnam beginning with Sarasijanabha (Natta Raga) is popular.

References

Male Carnatic singers
Carnatic singers
Carnatic composers
Swarabat players
1892 deaths
1815 births
Indian male composers
19th-century Indian male classical singers
19th-century Indian composers
People from Palakkad district
Musicians from Kerala